Albino Bol Dhieu is a South Sudanese politician and the incumbent Minister of Youth and Sports in South Sudan since 12 March 2020. He is a member of the Sudan People's Liberation Movement.

Controversy 
Albino Bol Dhieu issued a suspension letter to Gola Boyoi Gola, Chairperson of South Sudan National Youth Union, after social media circulated two letters allegedly written to the president of Egypt and the Deputy President of the Sudan Sovereign Council.

Albino Bol Dhieu was denied a U.S travel visa in 2017. He applied for a visa to travel to the U.S, but it was not approved until the time he was supposed to have traveled had already elapsed. No reason was given for the denial.

References 

South Sudanese politicians

Year of birth missing (living people)
Living people